Root cause may refer to:
 "Root Cause" (Person of Interest), a TV show episode
 Root cause analysis, a problem solving technique